The Forward Wind Energy Center is a 137.85 megawatt (MW) wind farm in Dodge and Fond du Lac County, Wisconsin near the village of Brownsville.  The wind farm sits on approximately 4,000 acres of land. "Forward" is the state's motto. The facility is sited in close proximity to the Horicon National Wildlife Refuge and the Horicon Marsh State Wildlife Area which provide nesting areas for waterfowl and a resting area for large numbers of migratory birds.

The project cost approximately $178 million dollars (2008 purchase price).

Details 
The project was developed by Invenergy and initially proposed in 2004 to be a 200 MW facility with 133 wind turbines.  The draft environmental impact statement (EIS) was submitted on March 8, 2005. After a 45-day public comment and review period, the final environmental impact statement was submitted on May 18, 2005. The project area contained within the final environmental impact statement project covers 32,400 acres (~50 square miles) with approximately 11,000 acres dedicated to turbine easements. The Public Service Commission of Wisconsin issued a Certificate of Public Convenience and Necessity (CPCN) on July 14, 2005.

Despite perceived initial support, there grew significant controversy in the siting selection related to the wildlife, visual, and other impacts.  These led to further environmental studies, offers of additional monetary compensation, organized opposition, and delays due to legal action.  Permitting from an Air Route Surveillance Radar facility to the south also slowed the project. The experience led some communities in the region to pass moratoria on further development, some of which have been challenged by state agencies.

The project was eventually approved to begin construction in 2007.  Brownsville-based Michels Corporation provided EPC services.   Completed in 2008, the downsized facility includes 85 General Electric SLE 1.6 MW wind turbines and a single GE SLE 1.85 MW turbine.  It is setback two-miles from the Horicon Marsh located to the west. Two smaller wind farms named "Cedar Ridge" (68 MW) and "Butler Ridge" (45 MW), as well as the 145 MW Blue Sky Green Field Wind Energy Center, came online within about the same year.

Followup information sessions and academic studies on the environmental and cultural impacts of the project have been pursued.  Macalester College has documented the controversy surrounding the project and studied its implications.  At the invitation of the Friends of the Horicon National Wildlife Refuge in 2010, the conservation chair of the Wisconsin Society for Ornithology further addressed local concerns on the effects of wind turbines on wildlife.  A two-year study of bird and bat mortality at the Forward Wind facility was completed by University of Wisconsin researchers for the Public Service Commission of Wisconsin, with a report published in August 2011.  Inline with similar studies elsewhere, it showed a relatively larger number of bat fatalities and a lesser number of added bird deaths. Red-tailed hawks represented around 20% of recorded bird fatalities.

Electricity production 

* Data not available

See also

Wind power in Wisconsin
Electrical Grid Regulation in Wisconsin
Environmental impact of wind power
List of wind farms in the United States
Centennial Wind Farm and Beech Ridge Wind Farm, also Invenergy LLC facilities.

References

External links
Fact Sheet - Forward Wind Park
Friends of Horicon Marsh Education and Visitor Center Website
Assessing Bird and Bat Mortality at the Forward Energy Center
Macalester College - Forward Wind Case Study
Invenergy Projects Website

Energy infrastructure completed in 2008
Buildings and structures in Dodge County, Wisconsin
Buildings and structures in Fond du Lac County, Wisconsin
Wind farms in Wisconsin
2008 establishments in Wisconsin